Groesffordd Halt railway station was a station situated to the east of Brecon, Powys, Wales. The station was opened by the Great Western Railway in 1934 and was closed in 1962. The station was demolished after closure, the area covered by a housing development.

References

Further reading

Disused railway stations in Powys
Former Great Western Railway stations
Railway stations in Great Britain opened in 1934
Railway stations in Great Britain closed in 1962